|}

The Legacy Stakes is a Listed flat horse race in Ireland open to thoroughbreds aged two years only. It is run at Navan over a distance of 5 furlongs and 164 yards (1,156 metres), and it is scheduled to take place each year in October.

The race was run for the first time in 2017.

Records
Leading jockey (3 wins):
 Colin Keane – 	Gobi Desert (2017), Frenetic (2020), Geocentric (2021)

Leading trainer (3 wins):
 Ger Lyons – Gobi Desert (2017), Frenetic (2020), Geocentric (2021)

Winners

See also
 Horse racing in Ireland
 List of Irish flat horse races

References

Racing Post:

Flat races in Ireland
Navan Racecourse
Flat horse races for two-year-olds
Recurring sporting events established in 2017
2017 establishments in Ireland